For the 1998 Japanese album Submerge, see Coaltar of the Deepers

Submerge is an Indian dance and clubbing scene founded in 2002 by MTV India VJ Nikhil Chinapa, with DJ Pearl, Chinappa's wife, as a co-founder.

Submerge has been influential in the music and clubbing scene in India by creating an alternative to the then existing music mainstream, playing music: techno, trance, house, progressive, psychedelic, tribal, electro and tech house sounds and unreleased or indie sounds. It is also host to many internationally renowned names in DJing and is planning to spread the formula all over India with big Indian and international names.

See also

List of electronic dance music venues

References

External links
Official website
Submerge at MySpace

Electronic dance music venues
Indian music